Lagriinae is a subfamily of long-jointed beetles in the family Tenebrionidae. There are more than 270 genera in Lagriinae, grouped into 11 tribes.

See also
 List of Lagriinae genera

References

Further reading

 
 

 
Beetle subfamilies
Taxa named by Pierre André Latreille